King of the Universe (Sumerian: lugal ki-sár-ra or lugal kiš-ki, Akkadian: šarru kiššat māti, šar-kiššati or šar kiššatim), also interpreted as King of Everything, King of the Totality, King of All or King of the World, was a title of great prestige claiming world domination used by powerful monarchs in ancient Mesopotamia. The title is sometimes applied to God in the Judeo-Christian and Abrahamic tradition.

The etymology of the title derives from the ancient Sumerian city of Kish (Sumerian: kiš, Akkadian: kiššatu), the original meaning being King of Kish. Although the equation of šar kiššatim as literally meaning "King of the Universe" was made during the Akkadian period, the title of "King of Kish" is older and was already seen as particularly prestigious, as the city of Kish was seen as having primacy over all other Mesopotamian cities. In Sumerian legend, Kish was the location where the kingship was lowered to from heaven after the legendary Flood.

The first ruler to use the title of King of the Universe was the Akkadian Sargon of Akkad (reigned c. 2334–2284 BC) and it was used in a succession of later empires claiming symbolical descent from Sargon's Akkadian Empire. The title saw its final usage under the Seleucids, Antiochus I (reigned 281–261 BC) being the last known ruler to be referred to as "King of the Universe".

It is possible, at least among Assyrian rulers, that the title of King of the Universe was not inherited through normal means. As the title is not attested for all Neo-Assyrian kings and for some only attested several years into their reign it might have had to be earned by each king individually, possibly through completing seven successful military campaigns. The similar title of šar kibrāt erbetti ("King of the Four Corners of the World") may have required successful military campaigns in all four points of the compass. Some scholars believe that the titles of King of the Universe and King of the Four Corners of the World, with near identical meanings, differed in that King of the Universe referred to rule over the cosmological realm whereas King of the Four Corners of the World referred to dominion over the terrestrial.

History

Background (2900–2334 BC) 

During the Early Dynastic Period in Mesopotamia (c. 2900–2350 BC), the rulers of the various city-states (the most prominent being Ur, Uruk, Lagash, Umma and Kish) in the region would often launch invasions into regions and cities far from their own, at most times with negligible consequences for themselves, in order to establish temporary and small empires to either gain or keep a superior position relative to the other city-states. This early empire-building was encouraged as the most powerful monarchs were often rewarded with the most prestigious titles, such as the title of lugal (literally "big man" but often interpreted as "king", probably with military connotations). Most of these early rulers had probably acquired these titles rather than inherited them.

Eventually this quest to be more prestigious and powerful than the other city-states resulted in a general ambition for universal rule. Since Mesopotamia was equated to correspond to the entire world and Sumerian cities had been built far and wide (cities the like of Susa, Mari and Assur were located near the perceived corners of the world) it seemed possible to reach the edges of the world (at this time thought to be the lower sea, the Persian gulf, and the upper sea, the Mediterranean).

Rulers attempting to reach a position of universal rule became more common during the Early Dynastic IIIb period (c. 2450–2350 BC) during which two prominent examples are attested. The first, Lugalannemundu, king of Adab, is claimed by the Sumerian King List (though this is a much later inscription, making the extensive rule of Lugalennemundu somewhat doubtful) to have created a great empire covering the entirety of Mesopotamia, reaching from modern Syria to Iran, saying that he "subjugated the Four Corners". The second, Lugalzaggesi, king of Uruk, conquered the entirety of Lower Mesopotamia and claimed (despite this not being the case) that his domain extended from the upper to the lower sea. Lugalzaggesi was originally titled as simply "King of Uruk" and adopted the title "King of the Land" (Sumerian: lugal-kalam-ma) to lay claim to universal rule. This title had also been employed by some earlier Sumerian kings claiming control over all of Sumer, such as Enshakushanna of Uruk.

Sargon of Akkad and his successors (2334–2154 BC) 

The earliest days of Mesopotamian empire-building was most often a struggle between the kings of the most prominent cities. In these early days, the title of "King of Kish" was already recognized as one of particular prestige, with the city being seen as having a sort of primacy over the other cities. By the time of Sargon of Akkad, "King of Kish" meant a divinely authorized ruler with the right to rule over all of Sumer, and it might have already somewhat referred to a universal ruler in the Early Dynastic IIIb period. Use of the title, which was not limited to kings actually in possession of the city itself, implied that the ruler was a builder of cities, victorious in war and a righteous judge. According to the Sumerian King List, the city of Kish was where the kingship was lowered to from heaven after the Flood, its rulers being the embodiment of human kingship.

Sargon began his political career as a cupbearer of Ur-Zababa, the ruler of the city of Kish. After somehow escaping assassination, Sargon became the ruler of Kish himself, adopting the title of šar kiššatim and eventually in 2334 BC founding the first great Mesopotamian empire, the Akkadian Empire (named after Sargon's second capital, Akkad). Sargon primarily used the title King of Akkad (šar māt Akkadi).

The title of šar kiššatim was prominently used by the successors of Sargon, including his grandson Naram-Sin (r. 2254–2218 BC), who also introduced the similar title of  "King of the Four Corners of the World". The transition from šar kiššatim meaning just "King of Kish" to it meaning "King of the Universe" happened already during the Old Akkadian period. It is important to note that Sargon and his successors did not rule the city of Kish directly and did thus not claim kingship over it. Until the time of Naram-Sin, Kish was ruled by a semi-independent ruler with the title ensik. "King of Kish" would have been rendered as lugal kiš in Sumerian, whilst the Akkadian kings rendered their new title as lugal ki-sár-ra or lugal kiš-ki in Sumerian.

It is possible that šar kiššatim referred to the authority to govern the cosmological realm whilst "King of the Four Corners" referred to the authority to govern the terrestrial. Eitherway, the implication of these titles was that the Mesopotamian king was the king of the entire world.

Assyrian and Babylonian Kings of the Universe (1809–627 BC) 

The title šar kiššatim was perhaps most prominently used by the kings of the Neo-Assyrian Empire, more than a thousand years after the fall of the Akkadian Empire. The Assyrians took it, as the Akkadians had intended, to mean "King of the Universe" and adopted it to lay claim to continuity from the old empire of Sargon of Akkad. The title had been used sporadically by previous Assyrian kings, such as Shamshi-Adad I (r. 1809–1776 BC) of the Old Assyrian Empire and Ashur-uballit I (r. 1353–1318 BC) of the Middle Assyrian Empire. Shamshi-Adad I was the first Assyrian king to adopt the title of "King of the Universe" and other Akkadian titles, possibly to challenge the claims of sovereignty made by neighboring kingdoms. In particular, the kings of Eshnunna, a city-state in central Mesopotamia, had used similar titles since the fall of the Neo-Sumerian Empire. From the reign of Ipiq-Adad I (1800s BC), the Eshnunnans had referred to their kings with the title of "Mighty King" (šarum dannum). The Eshnunnan kings Ipiq-Adad II and Dadusha even adopted the title šar kiššatim for themselves, signifying a struggle over the title with the Assyrians. The title was also claimed by some kings of Babylon and Mari.

The Neo-Assyrian Sargon II (r. 722–705 BC), namesake of Sargon of Akkad over a thousand years prior, had the full titulature of Great King, Mighty King, King of the Universe, King of Assyria, King of Babylon, King of Sumer and Akkad. Since the title is not attested for all Neo-Assyrian kings and for some only attested several years into their reigns, it is possible that the title of "King of the Universe" had to be earned by each king individually, but the process by which a king could acquire the title is unknown. British historian Stephanie Dalley, specializing in the Ancient Near East proposed in 1998 that the title may have had to be earned through the king successfully completing seven (which would have been connected to totality in the eyes of the Assyrians) successful military campaigns. This is similar to the title of King of the Four Corners of the World, which might have required the king to successfully campaign in all four points of the compass. It thus would not have been possible for a king to claim to be "King of the Universe" before completing the required military campaigns. The title seems to have had similar requirements among Babylonian kings, the king Ayadaragalama (c. 1500 BC) was only able to claim the title late in his reign, his earliest campaigns that established control over cities such as Kish, Ur, Lagash and Akkad not being enough to justify its use. Both Ayadaragalama and the later Babylonian king Kurigalzu II only appear to have been able to claim to be King of the Universe after their realm extended as far as Bahrain.

Even in the Neo-Assyrian period when Assyria was the dominant kingdom in Mesopotamia, the Assyrian use of King of the Universe was challenged as the kings of Urartu from Sarduri I (r. 834–828 BC) onwards began using the title as well, claiming to be equal to the Assyrian kings and asserting wide territorial rights.

Later examples (626–261 BC) 
The Neo-Assyrian Empire's domination over Mesopotamia ended with the establishment of the Neo-Babylonian Empire in 626 BC. With the sole exceptions of the first ruler of this empire, Nabopolassar, and the last, Nabonidus, the rulers of the Neo-Babylonian Empire abandoned most of the old Assyrian titles in their inscriptions. Nabopolassar used "mighty king" (šarru dannu) and Nabonidus utilized several of the Neo-Assyrian titles including "mighty king", "great king" (šarru rabu) and King of the Universe. Though not using them in royal inscriptions (e.g. not officially), both Nabopolassar and Nebuchadnezzar II used the title in economic documents.

The title was also among the many Mesopotamian titles assumed by Cyrus the Great of the Achaemenid Empire after his conquest of Babylon in 539 BC. In the text of the Cyrus Cylinder, Cyrus assumes several traditional Mesopotamian titles including those of "King of Babylon", "King of Sumer and Akkad" and "King of the Four Corners of the World". The title of King of the Universe was not used after the reign of Cyrus but his successors did adopt similar titles. The popular regnal title "King of Kings", used by monarchs of Iran until the modern age, was originally a title introduced by the Assyrian Tukulti-Ninurta I in the 13th century BC (rendered šar šarrāni in Akkadian). The title of "King of Lands", also used by Assyrian monarchs since at least Shalmaneser III, was also adopted by Cyrus the Great and his successors.

The title was last used in the Hellenic Seleucid Empire, which controlled Babylon following the conquests of Alexander the Great and the resulting Wars of the Diadochi. The title appears on the Antiochus Cylinder of king Antiochus I (r. 281–261 BC), which describes how Antiochus rebuilt the Ezida Temple in the city of Borsippa. It is worth noting that the last known surviving example of an Akkadian-language royal inscription preceding the Antiochus cylinder is the Cyrus Cylinder created nearly 300 years prior, and as such it is possible that more Achaemenid and Seleucid rulers would have assumed the title when in Mesopotamia. The Antiochus Cylinder was likely inspired in its composition by earlier Mesopotamian royal inscriptions and bears many similarities with Assyrian and Babylonian royal inscriptions. Titles such as "King of Kings" and "Great-King" (šarru rabu), ancient titles with the connotation of holding supreme power in the lands surrounding Babylon (in a similar way as to how titles like Imperator were used in Western Europe following the fall of the Western Roman Empire to establish supremacy), would remain in use in Mesopotamia up until the Sassanid dynasty in Persia of the 3rd to 7th centuries.

In religion 
The title King of the Universe has sometimes been applied to deities since at least the Neo-Assyrian period, even though the title in those times was also used by contemporary monarchs. A 680 BC inscription by the Neo-Assyrian king Esarhaddon (who in the same inscription himself uses the title "King of the Universe," among other titles), in Babylon, refers to the goddess Sarpanit (Babylon's patron deity) as "Queen of the Universe."

In Judaism, the title King of the Universe came to be applied to God. To this day, Jewish liturgical blessings generally begin with the phrase "Barukh ata Adonai Eloheinu, melekh ha`olam..." (Blessed are you, Lord our God, King of the Universe...). Throughout scripture, it is made clear that the Abrahamic deity is not supposed to be the God simply of a small tribe in Palestine, but the God of the entire world. In the Book of Psalms, God's universal kingship is repeatedly mentioned; for example, Psalms 47:2 refers to God as the "great King over all the earth."

In Christianity, the title is sometimes applied to Jesus. For example, Nikephoros I, Patriarch of Constantinople (c. 758–828), referred to Jesus' abandoning his terrestrial domain for a cosmic domain of infinite light and glory.

In Islam the equivalent term is "rabbil-'alamin" ("Lord of the Universe"), as found in the first chapter of the Quran.

Examples of rulers who used the title 

Kings of the Universe in the Akkadian Empire:

 Sargon (r. 2334–2279 BC) – not the first King of Kish, but the first ruler whose use of the title is identified with the connotation of King of the Universe.
Rimush (r. 2279–2270 BC)
 Naram-Sin (r. 2254–2218 BC)

Kings of the Universe in Upper Mesopotamia:

 Shamshi-Adad I (r. 1809–1776 BC)

Kings of the Universe in Eshnunna:

 Dadusha (c. 1800–1779 BC)
Naram-Suen (c. 1800 BC)
Ipiq-Adad II (r. ~1700 BC)

Kings of the Universe in Mari:

 Zimri-Lim (r. 1775–1761 BC)

Kings of the Universe in the Middle Assyrian Empire:

 Ashur-uballit I (r. 1353–1318 BC)
Adad-nirari I (r. 1295–1264 BC)
 Ashur-dan II (r. 934–912 BC)

Kings of the Universe in Babylonia:

 Ayadaragalama (r. ~1500 BC)
 Burna-Buriash II (r. 1359–1333 BC)
 Kurigalzu II (r. 1332–1308 BC)
Nazi-Maruttash (r. 1307–1282 BC)
Ninurta-nadin-shumi (r. 1132–1126 BC)
Nebuchadnezzar I (r. 1126–1103 BC)
Enlil-nadin-apli (r. 1103–1099 BC)
Marduk-nadin-ahhe (r. 1099–1082 BC)
Marduk-shapik-zeri (r. 1082–1069 BC)
Adad-apla-iddina (r. 1069–1046 BC)
Nabu-shum-libur (r. 1033–1026 BC)
Eulmash-shakin-shumi (r. 1004–987 BC)
Mar-biti-apla-usur (r. 984–979 BC)

Kings of the Universe in the Neo-Assyrian Empire:

 Adad-nirari II (r. 912–891 BC)
 Tukulti-Ninurta II (r. 891–884 BC)
 Adad-nirari III (r. 811–783 BC)
 Tiglath-Pileser III (r. 745–727 BC)
Shalmaneser V (r. 727–722 BC)
 Sargon II (r. 722–705 BC)
Sennacherib (r. 705–681 BC)
 Esarhaddon (r. 681–669 BC)
 Ashurbanipal (r. 669–631 BC)
 Shamash-shum-ukin (Neo-Assyrian king of Babylon, r. 667–648 BC)
 Ashur-etil-ilani (r. 631–627 BC)
Sinsharishkun (r. 627–612 BC)

Kings of the Universe in Urartu:

 Sarduri I (r. 834–828 BC) and his successors.

Kings of the Universe of the Cimmerians:

 Tugdamme (mid-7th century)

Kings of the Universe in the Neo-Babylonian Empire:

 Nabopolassar (r. 626–605 BC) – in economic documents.
 Nebuchadnezzar II (r. 605–562 BC) – in economic documents.
 Nabonidus (r. 556–539 BC) – only Neo-Babylonian king to call himself King of the Universe in his royal inscriptions.

Kings of the Universe in the Achaemenid Empire:

 Cyrus the Great (r. 559–530 BC) – claimed the title from 539 BC.

Kings of the Universe in the Seleucid Empire:

 Antiochus I (r. 281–261 BC)

See also

References

Notes

Citations

Bibliography

Websites 

 

 

24th-century BC establishments
3rd-century BC disestablishments
Ancient Mesopotamia
Sumer
Babylon
Akkadian Empire
Neo-Assyrian Empire
 
Royal titles